In baseball, a double play is the act of making two outs during the same continuous play. 

Double Play may refer to:
double play magnetic tape Audio tape specifications
Double Play!, jazz album
Double Play, album from Nancy Wilson discography
"Double Play!", an episode of The Racoons
Double Play (Twin Peaks)
Double Play (film) (2017)